Castle Sinclair Girnigoe is located about 3 miles north of Wick on the east coast of Caithness, Scotland.  It is considered to be one of the earliest seats of Clan Sinclair. It comprises the ruins of two castles: the 15th-century Castle Girnigoe; and the early 17th-century Castle Sinclair. They are designated as a scheduled monument.

History

The earlier Castle Girnigoe was built by William Sinclair, 2nd Earl of Caithness, probably sometime between 1476 and 1496, but certainly before his death at the Battle of Flodden in 1513. There is some evidence to suggest that the castle was built on the foundations of an earlier fortalice.

Olave Sinclair, the foud of Shetland, was brought to Girnigoe in May 1573, paralysed after a stroke. In 1577, George Sinclair, 4th Earl of Caithness, imprisoned his own son John Sinclair, Master of Caithness, in Castle Girnigoe, on suspicion of rebelling against his rule.  He was held there for seven years, after which his father fed him a diet of salted beef, with nothing to drink, so that he eventually died insane from thirst. The rebel Earl of Bothwell was at Girnigoe in December 1594.

Expansion occurred in 1606 when Castle Sinclair was built, comprising a gatehouse and other buildings, along with a curtain wall.  These were connected to the earlier castle by a drawbridge over a ravine. The same year George Sinclair, 5th Earl of Caithness, requested the Scottish Parliament to change the name to Castle Sinclair, but because the names Castle Sinclair and Castle Girnigoe were both written down in 1700, both names have been in use since.

Robert Sinclair describes Girnigoe as "an adapted 5-storey L-plan crow-stepped gabled tower house, which sat upon a rocky promontory jutting out into Sinclair Bay. Of interest is the secret chamber in the vaulted ceiling of the kitchen."

In 1672, George Sinclair, 6th Earl of Caithness, was in heavy debt to his fourth cousin, John Campbell of Glenorchy, and transferred the castle to Campbell as payment. When Sinclair died four years later with no heir, Campbell claimed the title Earl of Caithness and married Sinclair's widow. However, Sinclair's first cousin, George Sinclair of Keiss, challenged Campbell's title. This resulted in the Battle of Altimarlach in which Campbell defeated Sinclair in 1680. Glenorchy and some of his troops remained in Caithness for some time and levied rents and taxes on the people, subjecting them to the most grievous oppression. He sent the remainder home immediately after the battle. However, George Sinclair of Keiss continued his opposition and laid siege, with firearms and artillery, to Castle Sinclair Girnigoe which he took after feeble resistance from the garrison. As a result, he and his three friends who had assisted him, Sinclair of Broynach, Sinclair of Thura and Mackay of Strathnaver were declared rebels. The political current having turned in favor of Sinclair of Keiss however, this was quashed. Having failed to regain his inheritance by force, Sinclair of Keiss then turned to the law. Through the influence of the Duke of York and afterwards James II,  he took his place as 7th Earl of Caithness on 15 July 1681, and his lands were restored on 23 September. Campbell of Glenorchy was made Earl of Breadalbane by way of compensation.

Preservation

Since 1998 the Clan Sinclair Trust has been carrying out archaeological research in the castle and are also seeking to preserve the castle. The castle is the only castle in Scotland which is listed by the World Monuments Fund.

Image gallery

See also
Battle of Champions – fought just west of the castle in 1478 or 1464
Castle of Mey
Roslin Castle
Rosslyn Chapel
Sinclair (surname)

References

External links

official website of Castle Sinclair Girnigoe

Buildings and structures in Caithness
Houses in Highland (council area)
Ruined castles in Highland (council area)
Castle
Scheduled Ancient Monuments in Highland